Danni Jensen (born 10 June 1989) is a Danish footballer who plays as a right back for Boldklubben Frem. He has previously played for Danish Superliga club F.C. Copenhagen.

He was promoted to the first team at training start in the summer 2008, together with Jacob Albrechtsen. Although, both of them joined the first team at a training camp at La Manga Club in January 2008.

Jensen's first team debut came on 31 July 2008 in a UEFA Cup qualifier against Cliftonville from Northern Ireland. He played the whole second half on the right back after having substituted Zdeněk Pospěch in the half time.

Honours
Danish Superliga: 2008–09, 2009–10 & 2010-11
Danish Cup: 2008–09
Danish U-16 League Champion: 2005

References

External links
F.C. Copenhagen profile
Danish national team profile

1989 births
Living people
Danish men's footballers
F.C. Copenhagen players
Danish Superliga players
Association football fullbacks
Association football defenders
BK Avarta players
People from Høje-Taastrup Municipality
Sportspeople from Region Zealand
Sportspeople from the Capital Region of Denmark